Elso Brito (born 2 April 1994) is a professional footballer who plays as a left midfielder for Eerste Divisie club Dordrecht. Born in the Netherlands, he represents the Cape Verde national team.

Club career
On 26 June 2022, Brito signed a two-year contract with Eerste Divisie club Dordrecht.

International career
Brito was born in the Netherlands to Cape Verdean parents. He made his debut in a 0–0 (4–3) penalty shootout win over Andorra on 3 June 2018.

External links
 Voetbal International profile

References

1994 births
Living people
Citizens of Cape Verde through descent
Dutch sportspeople of Cape Verdean descent
Cape Verdean footballers
Dutch footballers
Footballers from Rotterdam
Association football midfielders
Cape Verde international footballers
Eredivisie players
Eerste Divisie players
II liga players
Excelsior Rotterdam players
SC Telstar players
Go Ahead Eagles players
Wigry Suwałki players
FC Dordrecht players
Dutch expatriate footballers
Cape Verdean expatriate footballers
Cape Verdean expatriate sportspeople in Poland
Dutch expatriate sportspeople in Poland
Expatriate footballers in Poland